Abune Tekle Haymanot (Ge'ez: አቡነ ተክለ ሃይማኖት; known in the Coptic Church as Saint Takla Haymanot of Ethiopia; 1215 – 1313) was an Ethiopian saint and monk mostly venerated as a hermit. He was the Abuna of Ethiopia who founded a major monastery in his native province of Shewa. He is significant for being the only Ethiopian saint popular both amongst Ethiopians and outside that country. Tekle Haymanot "is the only Ethiopian saint celebrated officially in foreign churches such as Rome and Egypt." His feast day is 30 August (Nehasə 24 in Ethiopian calendar), and the 24th day of every month in the Ethiopian calendar is dedicated to Tekle Haymanot.

Early life 
Tekle Haymanot was born in Zorare, a district in Selale which lies on the eastern edge of Shewa. He was the son of the priest Tsega Zeab (ጸጋ ዘአብ) ("Gift of Faith") and his wife Egzi'e Haraya ("Choice of God"), who is also known as Sarah; Tekle Haymanot was born after his parents, who had failed to have children, pledged their firstborn to God. 

During his youth, Shewa was subject to a number of devastating raids by Matolomi, the pagan king of Damot, which lay beyond the Jamma River. One of Matolomi's most notorious predations was the raid which led to the abduction of Egzi'e Haraya; she is said to have been reunited with Tsega Zeab through the intercession of the Archangel Michael; when Matolomi found out that they were escaping he threw a spear who turned from them to his direction and killed him.  There are several traditions like that one, some of less historical value than others, which describe Tekle Haymanot's interactions with King Matolomi.

His father gave Tekle Haymanot their earliest religious instruction; later he was ordained a priest by the Egyptian Bishop Cyril (known as Kirollos in Coptic).

Later career 

The first significant event in his life was when Tekle Haymanot, at the age of 30, travelled north to seek further religious education. His journey took him from Selale to Grarya, then Katata, Damot, Amhara, to end at the monastery of Iyasus Mo'a, who had only a few years before founded a monastery on an island in the middle of Lake Hayq in the district of Amba Sel (the present-day Amhara Region). There Tekle Haymanot studied under the abbot for nine years before travelling to Tigray, where he visited Axum, then stayed for a while at the monastery of Debre Damo, where he studied under Abbot Yohannes, Iyasus Mo'a's spiritual teacher. By this point he had developed a small group of followers, attracted by his reputation.

Eventually, Tekle Haymanot left Debre Damo with his followers to return to Shewa. En route, he stopped at the monastery of Iyasus Mo'a, where tradition states he received the full investiture of an Ethiopian monk's habit. The historian Taddesse Tamrat sees in the existing accounts of this act an attempt by later writers to justify the seniority of the monastery in Lake Hayq over the followers of Tekle Haymanot.

Once in Shewa, he introduced the spirit of renewal that Christianity was experiencing in the northern provinces. He settled in the central area between Selale and Grarya, where he founded in 1284 the monastery of Debre Atsbo (renamed in the 15th century Debre Libanos). This monastery became one of the most important religious institutions of Ethiopia, not only founding a number of daughter houses, but its abbot became one of the principal leaders of the Ethiopian Church, called the Echege, second only to the Abuna.

Tekle Haymanot lived for 29 years after the foundation of this monastery, dying in the year before Emperor Wedem Arad did; this would date Tekle Haymanot's death to 1313. He was first buried in the cave where he had originally lived as a hermit; almost 60 years later he was reinterred at Debre Libanos. In the 1950s, Emperor Haile Selassie constructed a new church at Debre Libanos Monastery over the site of the Saint's tomb.  It remains a place of pilgrimage and a favored site for burial for many people across Ethiopia.

Later traditions 
Tekle Haymanot is frequently represented as an old man with wings on his back and only one leg visible. There are a number of explanations for this popular image. C.F. Beckingham and G.W.B. Huntingford recount one story, that the saint "having stood too long for about 34 years, one of his legs broke or cut while Satan was attempting to stop his prayers, whereupon he stood on one foot for 7 years." Paul B. Henze describes his missing leg as appearing as a "severed leg ... in the lower left corner discreetly wrapped in a cloth." The traveller Thomas Pakenham learned from the Prior of Debre Damo how Tekle Haymanot received his wings:

One day he said he would go to Jerusalem to see the Garden of Gethsemane and the hill of the skull that is called Golgotha. But Shaitan (Satan) planned to stop Tekla Haymanot going on his journey to the Holy Land, and he cut the rope which led from the rock to the ground just as Tekla Haymanot started to climb down. Then God gave Tekla Haymanot six wings and he flew down to the valley below ... and from that day onwards Teklahaimanot would fly back and forth to Jerusalem above the clouds like an aeroplane.

Many traditions hold that Tekle Haymanot played a significant role in Yekuno Amlak's ascension as the restored monarchy of the Solomonic dynasty, following two centuries of rule by the Zagwe dynasty, although historians like Taddesse Tamrat believe these are later inventions. (A few older traditions credit Iyasus Mo'a with this honour.)

Another tradition credits Tekle Haymanot as the only Lek'e P'ap'as of Ethiopia who was born in Ethiopia and who was Ethiopian.
After the new Lek'e P'ap'as  Abuna Yohannes from Egypt sent by the Patriarch of Alexandria arrived at Ethiopia he decided to separate: One part of Ethiopia to Tekle Haimanot and one part to himself, but Tekle Haimanot didn't want the high rank as Lek'e P'ap'as anymore and retired from his position to become a monk again.

A number hagiographies of this saint have been written. G.W.B. Huntingford mentions two different gadlat: "one written by Abba Samuel of Waldiba in the first quarter of the 15th century and the other by one Gibra Maskel of Debre Libanos early in the 16th century". E.A. Wallis Budge has translated a third one, entitled The Life of Täklä Haymanot, which is attributed to one Täklä Sion. Tesfaye Gebre Mariam adds to these another version, popular at the monastery of Debre Libanos and containing far more details of the saint's life than any other version of the gadla, and which Tesfaye confirmed was written by Ichege Yohannis Kema.

See also
 Coptic Christianity
 Ethiopian Orthodox Tewahedo Church
 St. Takla Haymanot's Church (Alexandria)

References

External links
The official Coptic life of Saint Takla Haymanot the Ethiopian
Entry from the Biographical Dictionary of Christian Missions
Biography of Takla Haymanot by Taddesse Tamrat for The Dictionary of Ethiopian Biography

13th-century Ethiopian people
14th-century Ethiopian people
1215 births
1313 deaths
Ethiopian saints
14th-century Christian saints
14th-century Oriental Orthodox clergy